London Buses route 88 is a Transport for London contracted bus route in London, England. Running between Parliament Hill Fields and Clapham Common, it is operated by London General. The route used to be known as "the Clapham Omnibus" when it was run by London General with single-decker buses.

History
Route 88 was the first "Metropolitan" route to receive AEC NS-type buses, running between Acton Green and Mitcham.

Between 1993 and 1997, Volvos were used to run the route. For some time, the route was the only one to use the buses.

London General successfully retained route 88 with new contracts starting on 13 December 2003 and 11 December 2010.

New Routemasters were introduced on 22 August 2015.

On 30 March 2019, the route was extended from Camden Town to Parliament Hill Fields and re-routed between Camden Town and Great Portland Street Station to go via Albany Street and ultimately replace the C2, which ceased operation entirely.

Current route
Route 88 operates via these primary locations:

 Parliament Hill Fields for Hampstead Heath
 Kentish Town Station  
Camden Town station  
Regent's Park Barracks
Great Portland Street station 
Oxford Circus station 
Regent Street
Piccadilly Circus station 
Trafalgar Square for Charing Cross station  
Whitehall
Westminster station 
Tate Britain
Vauxhall Bridge
Vauxhall bus station  for Vauxhall station  
Vauxhall Park
Stockwell station 
Clapham North & Clapham High Street stations  
Clapham Common station 
Clapham Common Omnibus Clapham

References

External links

Timetable

Bus routes in London
Transport in the London Borough of Camden
Transport in the London Borough of Lambeth
Transport in the City of Westminster